The 1993 FIA Formula 3000 International Championship was a motor racing series for Formula 3000 cars. Contested over nine races, it was the ninth FIA Formula 3000 International Championship. 
pl
Olivier Panis won the championship driving a Reynard 93D for the French DAMS team.

Technical changes
The 1993 Championship was the first to feature only one make of chassis, although the rules were still open to multiple manufacturers. Ralt had already ceased involvement in F3000 in 1992. After two poor seasons, Lola had no European customers after their two French teams, DAMS and Apomatox, switched to Reynards. Lolas would continue to have success in Japan, and would return to Europe in 1994.

In 1992, the manufacturers had agreed to a two-year cycle for chassis development for the first time, with the intention of reducing costs. Several teams, including the previous champions Crypton, kept their Reynard 92D cars. The new 93D featured a manual sequential gearbox, as opposed to the H-pattern found on the previous car, along with aerodynamic and suspension improvements.

Cosworth introduced a new low-crank engine, the AC, to compete with the Judd KV. Several teams retained the old DFV, which would score its last major victory at Pau. For the first time since 1988, there were no Mugen Honda engines in Europe.

Season summary

Olivier Beretta joined the Forti Corse team for 1993, and won the opening round at Donington Park. Reigning British Formula 3 Champion Gil de Ferran then won at Silverstone. The Pau Grand Prix was marked by the usual first-lap crash at the Lyceé hairpin, followed by another on the pit straight as several drivers were unable to see the red flags. Pedro Lamy won the restarted race, giving the DFV its last major victory.

Enna produced the usual crashes, as well as a fine battle for the lead between Lamy and eventual winner David Coulthard. Frenchman Olivier Panis then won both German rounds and at Spa-Francorchamps in Belgium.

A rain shower caused havoc at Magny-Cours. Panis lost the lead due to a stuck wheel nut when he pitted for rain tires. His DAMS teammate Franck Lagorce picked up the win.

Going into the final round at Nogaro, Panis led Lamy by a single point. Coulthard also had an outside chance at the title, but he retired after only a few corners. Later on the opening lap, Panis was taken out by Vincenzo Sospiri, and had to be restrained from attacking the Italian in the pitlane. Shortly thereafter, though, Lamy came into the pits with damaged rear suspension. His team would repair it, but he lost several laps. With all three contenders eliminated in the opening laps, Panis celebrated from the pit wall as his teammate Lagorce won from the two Apomatox cars of Boullion and Collard.

Drivers and teams

The following drivers and teams competed in the championship.

Calendar
The championship was contested over nine races.

Points system
For every race points were awarded: 9 points for first place, 6 for second place, 4 for third place, 3 for fourth place, 2 for fifth place and 1 for sixth place. All results were taken into consideration in determining the title.

Championship standings

Complete Overview

R10=retired, but classified NC=not classified  R=retired NS=did not start NQ=did not qualify DIS(6)=disqualified after finishing in sixth place

References

International Formula 3000
International Formula 3000 seasons